Simpkins is a surname, and may refer to:
Andy Simpkins (1932–1999), American jazz musician
Charles Simpkins (b. 1963), American Olympic athlete
Chris Simpkins (contemporary), Chief Executive of the Falkland Islands 2003–2007
C. O. Simpkins, Sr. (1925–2019), American politician and civil rights activist
Cuthbert Ormond Simpkins (b. 1947), American physician, biographer, and historian
Dickey Simpkins (b. 1972), American professional basketball player
James Simpkins (b. unknown, d. 2004), Canadian cartoonist and artist
John Simpkins (1862–1898), American politician from Massachusetts; U.S. representative 1895–98
Luke Simpkins (b. 1964), Australian politician from Western Australia
Michael Simpkins (b. 1978), English professional football player
Paul Simpkins (contemporary), Australian professional rugby league referee
Ron Simpkins (b. 1958), American professional football player
Ryan Simpkins (b. 1988), Australian Rugby League player
Ryan Simpkins (b. 1998), American actress
Ty Simpkins (b. 2001), American actor